The year 2010 is the 18th year in the history of the Ultimate Fighting Championship (UFC), a mixed martial arts promotion based in the United States. In 2010 the UFC held 24 events beginning with, UFC 108: Evans vs. Silva.

Title fights

The Ultimate Fighter

Debut UFC fighters

The following fighters fought their first UFC fight in 2010:

Aaron Wilkinson
Alexandre Ferreira
Amilcar Alves
Brad Tavares
Carlos Eduardo Rocha
Charles Oliveira
Charlie Brenneman
Chris Camozzi
Christian Morecraft
Claude Patrick
Cody McKenzie
Court McGee
Cyrille Diabaté
Daniel Roberts
Darren Elkins
David Branch
David Mitchell
Dongi Yang
Edson Barboza
Fabio Maldonado
Fredson Paixão
Gerald Harris
Gilbert Yvel
Greg Soto
Ian Loveland
Jake Shields
James Hammortree

James Te-Huna
James Toney
Jamie Yeager
Jason High
Jesse Bongfeldt
Joey Beltran
John Gunderson
John Makdessi
John Salter
Jonathan Brookins
Josh Bryant
Julio Paulino
Karlos Vemola
Kris McCray
Kurt Warburton
Kyle Noke
Kyle Watson
Maiquel Falcão
Mark Holst
Mark Hunt
Mark Scanlon
Michael Johnson
Mike Guymon
Mike Lullo
Nam Phan
Nick Pace

Pablo Garza
Pascal Krauss
Pat Audinwood
Paul Sass
Phil Davis
Rafael Natal
Renzo Gracie
Ricardo Romero
Rich Attonito
Rob Broughton
Rolles Gracie Jr.
Ronys Torres
Rory MacDonald
Sako Chivitchian
Sean McCorkle
Sean Pierson
Seth Baczynski
T.J. O'Brien
T.J. Waldburger
Takanori Gomi
Todd Brown
Travis Browne
Tyler Toner
Vinicius Queiroz
Waylon Lowe
Will Campuzano

Events list

See also
 UFC
 List of UFC champions
 List of UFC events

References

Ultimate Fighting Championship by year
2010 in mixed martial arts